This article shows the players that have played for the Queensland State of Origin team in every State of Origin series.

1980 game
Only one State of Origin game was played in both 1980 and 1981

1981 game

1982 Series

1983 Series

1984 Series

1985 Series

1986 Series

1987 Series

1988 Series

1989 Series

1990 Series

1991 Series

1992 Series

1993 Series

1994 Series

1995 Series

1996 Series

1997 Series

State of Origin
Only Australian Rugby League players could play in the State of Origin series.

Tri-Series
Only Super League players could play in the Super League Tri-series.

1998 Series

1999 Series

2000 Series

2001 Series

2002 Series

2003 Series

2004 Series

2005 Series

2006 Series

2007 Series

2008 series

2009 Series

2010 series

2011 series

2012 series

1 - Sam Thaiday was originally selected to play but withdrew due to a shoulder injury. He was replaced by interchange forward David Taylor whilst Corey Parker was called onto the bench.
2 - Billy Slater was originally selected to play but withdrew due to a knee injury sustained during Game II. He was replaced by Greg Inglis whilst Dane Nielson came into the centres for Inglis.

2013 series

1 - Martin Kennedy  was originally selected as 18th man in game two but withdrew due to injury. He was replaced by Jacob Lillyman.

2014 series

1 - The number 11 jumper was rested in honour of Arthur Beetson in Game One, which marked the 100th State Of Origin game, with Chris McQueen wearing the number 18 jumper. Playing at prop forward, Beetson captained Queensland in the first ever State of Origin game at Lang Park in 1980 and wore the number 11 jumper.

2015 series

1 - Daly Cherry-Evans was originally selected to play in game one but withdrew due to injury. He was replaced by Michael Morgan, then Morgan retained his spot on the bench in Game II and III.

2016 series

2017 series

2018 series

2019 series

2020 series

2021 series

2022 series

References

External links
QUEENSLAND STATE OF ORIGIN HONOUR ROLL at qrl.com.au
"Every State of Origin rep" at couriermail.com.au

Queensland rugby league team squads